Hinton Ampner is a village and country house estate with gardens within the civil parish of Bramdean and Hinton Ampner, near Alresford, Hampshire, England. The village and house are 8 miles due east of Winchester. The name probably derives from a combination of old English words Hea (high ground), Tun (homestead) and Higna (home of the monks), with the suffix Ampner being a corruption of Almoner, as the manor was once attached to a priory landholding.

The house is a Grade II listed building. The house and garden are owned by the National Trust and are open to the public.

History
The area around Hinton has evidence of Neolithic and Bronze Age settlement, including the presence of several barrows. The first record of the village was in the Domesday survey of 1086 which recorded 8 Hides and a church.

In the 1540s, a large Tudor Manor House was built in Hinton Ampner. By 1597, the house was under the ownership of the Stewkeley family, when Thomas Stewkeley took over the lease from the Dean and Chapter of Winchester. In 1719, on the death of Sir Hugh Stewkeley, the estate passed to his daughter Mary who married Edward Stawell. Their descendant, Henry Stawell Bilson-Legge subsequently inherited the estate and demolished the Tudor house in favour of a new building (the old house being on the site of the present day orchard).

The current Hinton Ampner house was built in 1793 and remodelled extensively in 1867. The house passed into the Dutton family in 1803 when Mary Bilson-Legge married John Dutton. It passed to their son, James Dutton, 3rd Baron Sherborne, whose descendants owned the estate until it passed to the National Trust. The house was again remodelled again in the Neo-Georgian style by Trenwith Wills and Lord Gerald Wellesley for Ralph Dutton between 1936 and 1939 to his vision of what it would have been like had it been built on its current scale in 1790 – a Georgian country house.

During the Second World War, the house was used as accommodation for girls from the Portsmouth Girls School to keep them away from the city. The house was badly damaged by fire in 1960, and restored again much as it had appeared in 1936, while the current garden layout of the house was created by Ralph Stawell Dutton (1898–1985), the 8th and last Baron Sherborne, starting in 1930, making this a modern 20th-century garden. The property is now noted both for its house and extensive gardens. Previously, the parkland came directly up to the house, which was designed to be a hunting lodge. The house contains a number of fine paintings. There is a set of paintings of the four seasons by Jacob de Wit, depicting cherubs painted in a three-dimensional monochrome style.

Ralph Dutton, with no direct heirs, gave the estate to the National Trust, on his death in 1985.

Poltergeist claims

The old Tudor house attained notoriety, in the 18th century, after it was said to have become uninhabitable due to loud noises attributed to a poltergeist. One tenant, Mary Ricketts, wrote about her experiences in the house. Harry Price, citing Ricketts' statements, wrote at length about the case in his book Poltergeist Over England (1945).

Claims about the poltergeist were disputed by Trevor H. Hall who suggested that "underground water was mainly responsible for the noises at Hinton, although the account of some of them is highly suggestive of seismic disturbance."

Geography
The village lies on the north slope of a long chalk ridge, with the house and church at its highest point. The area is part of the broader Hampshire Downs, a large area of predominantly chalk downland. The nearest large river is the River Itchen to the west of the area. To the north west of Hinton is the village of Cheriton and New Cheriton. The village of Kilmeston is to the south.

Church

The local church, All Saints Church, lies between the Manor House and village cottages.  The current church dates mostly from the 13th century but incorporates some pre-Norman Conquest elements from a previous church. The church was altered in the early 19th century and the bell tower modified. The church contains numerous memorials to the previous owners of the estate, as well as three historic bells (two dated 1603 and the other 1719). The church also contains several items and memorials rescued from the church of St.Mary at Laverstoke which was demolished in the early 1950s. The Church is a

References

External links 

 Hinton Ampner – official site at National Trust
 
 A Natural History of Ghosts – a history of the haunting of the house

Country houses in Hampshire
Gardens in Hampshire
Historic house museums in Hampshire
National Trust properties in Hampshire
Grade II listed houses
Grade II listed buildings in Hampshire
Reportedly haunted locations in South East England
Former civil parishes in Hampshire